The Agaw or Central Cushitic languages are Afro-Asiatic languages spoken by several groups in Ethiopia and, in one case, Eritrea.  They form the main substratum influence on Amharic and other Ethiopian Semitic languages.

Classification
The Central Cushitic languages are classified as follows (after Appleyard):

 Awngi (South Agaw) spoken southwest of Lake Tana, much the largest, with over 350,000 speakers
(Kunfal, spoken west of Lake Tana, is poorly recorded but most likely a dialect of Awngi)
 Northern Agaw:
Bilen–Xamtanga:
 Bilen (North) spoken (70,000 speakers) in Eritrea around the town of Keren and eastern Sudan around the town of Kassala
 Xamtanga (Central Agaw; also called Khamir, Khamta) 143,000 speakers in the North Amhara Region
 Qimant (Western Agaw) nearly extinct, spoken by the Qemant in Semien Gondar Zone
(dialects Qwara – nearly extinct, spoken by Beta Israel formerly living in Qwara, now in Israel; Kayla – extinct, formerly spoken by some Beta Israel, transitional between Qimant and Xamtanga)

There is a literature in Agaw but it is widely dispersed: from medieval texts containing passages in the Qimant language, now mostly in Israeli museums, to the modern Bilen language with its own newspaper, based in Keren, Eritrea. Historical material is also available in the Xamtanga language, and there is a deep tradition of folklore in the Awngi language.

Phonology

See also
Agaw people
List of Proto-Agaw reconstructions (Wiktionary)

Bibliography
Appleyard, David L. (2006) A Comparative Dictionary of the Agaw Languages (Kuschitische Sprachstudien – Cushitic Language Studies Band 24). Köln: Rüdiger Köppe Verlag.
Hetzron, Robert (1976) The Agaw Languages. Afroasiatic Linguistics 3,3. p. 31–37
 Joswig, Andreas and Hussein Mohammed (2011). A Sociolinguistic Survey Report; Revisiting the Southern Agaw Language areas of Ethiopia. SIL International. SIL Electronic Survey Reports 2011-047.

References